Matti Laukkonen (30 August 1883, Karstula – 20 May 1946) was a Finnish house painter, journalist and politician. He was a Member of the Parliament of Finland from 1919 to 1922, representing the Social Democratic Party of Finland (SDP).

References

1883 births
1946 deaths
People from Karstula
People from Vaasa Province (Grand Duchy of Finland)
Social Democratic Party of Finland politicians
Members of the Parliament of Finland (1919–22)